Sushil KC (born 23 April 1990 in Pokhara) is a Nepali footballer. He plays for Manang Marshyangdi Club in Nepal National League as a midfielder. He also played for the Nepal national football team making his debut against India on 31 August 2015.

Career 
Sushil KC graduated from the ANFA Academy in 2007 and a couple years later joined Friends Club.

International career 
Shushil KC has represented Nepal at the U14, U16, and U23 level. He plays as a midfielder and is known as one of the quickest players in the squad.

Personal life 
Sushil KC has a tattoo of Ganesha on his right arm.

References 

1990 births
Living people
People from Pokhara
Association football midfielders
Nepalese footballers
Manang Marshyangdi Club players
Nepal international footballers
Footballers at the 2014 Asian Games
Asian Games competitors for Nepal